John N. MacBryde (1883–1966) was an American stage and radio actor. He is best known as the original voice of the Old Ranger on the radio series Death Valley Days (1930-1940s).

References

External links
John 'Jack' MacBryde at otrpedia.com

1883 births
1966 deaths
American male radio actors
American male voice actors
American male stage actors
Date of birth missing
Date of death missing
Place of birth missing
Place of death missing